McKinley School is a historic school building in Cincinnati, Ohio. It was listed in the National Register of Historic Places on August 24, 1979.

Notes

External links
Documentation from the University of Cincinnati

National Register of Historic Places in Cincinnati
School buildings on the National Register of Historic Places in Ohio